The 1979 Queen's Club Championships  (known for sponsorship as the Stella Artois Championships) was a men's tennis tournament played on outdoor grass courts at the Queen's Club in London in the United Kingdom that was part of the 1979 Colgate-Palmolive Grand Prix circuit. It was the 77th edition of the tournament and was held from 11 June through 17 June 1979. Second-seeded John McEnroe won the singles title.

Finals

Singles

 John McEnroe defeated  Victor Pecci 6–7, 6–1, 6–1
 It was McEnroe's 5th singles title of the year and the 10th of his career.

Doubles

 Tim Gullikson /  Tom Gullikson defeated  Marty Riessen /  Sherwood Stewart 6–4, 6–4
 It was Tim Gullikson's 1st title of the year and the 8th of his career. It was Tom Gullikson's 1st title of the year and the 5th of his career.

References

External links
 ITF tournament edition details
 ATP tournament profile

Queen's Club Championships
Queen's Club Championships
Queen's Club Championships
Queen's Club Championships
Queen's Club Championships